Fragments is an album by Canadian jazz pianist Paul Bley recorded in 1986 and released on the ECM label.

Reception

The AllMusic review by Stephen Cook awarded the album 4 stars, stating: "this 1986 session ranks high among his many solo and group outings for the label... Overcast and a bit icy as one might expect, but nevertheless Bley's Fragments makes for a consistently provocative and enjoyable listen." The Penguin Guide to Jazz said "The writing and arranging are surprisingly below par and the recording isn't quite as clean as it might be".

Track listing
All compositions by Paul Bley except as indicated
 "Memories" – 7:26 
 "Monica Jane" (Bill Frisell) – 7:09 
 "Line Down" (John Surman) – 7:17 
 "Seven" (Carla Bley) – 5:44 
 "Closer" (Carla Bley) – 5:08 
 "Once Around the Park" (Paul Motian) – 6:40 
 "Hand Dance" – 2:54 
 "For the Love of Sarah" (Motian) – 5:46 
 "Nothing Ever Was, Anyway" (Annette Peacock) – 6:01 
Recorded at Rainbow Studio in Oslo, Norway in January 1986.

Personnel
 Paul Bley – piano
 John Surman – baritone saxophone, soprano saxophone, bass clarinet
 Bill Frisell – guitar
 Paul Motian – drums

References

ECM Records albums
Paul Bley albums
1986 albums